Croats in Germany refers to persons living in Germany who have total or partial Croatian ancestry. They form the sixth largest ethnic minority in Germany. In 2021, there were 434,610 Croats holding Croatian citizenship and living in Germany. Croatia's State Office for the Croats Abroad, Croatian embassy in Berlin and Croatian Catholic Missions estimated that there are more than 500,000 Croats and their descendants living in Germany.

Demographics 
According to the German Federal Statistical Office of Wiesbaden in 2021, there were 434,610 Croatian citizens living in Germany. According to data from church institutions there are about 310,000 to 350,000 Croatians living in Germany.

Numbers of Croats

In Germany per year 
 2021: 434,610
 2020: 426,485
 2019: -
 2018: 395,665
 2017: 367,900
 2016: 332,605
 2015: -
 2014: 270,558
 2013: -
 2012: -
 2011: -
 2010: 220,199
 2009: -
 2008: -
 2007: 225,309
 2006: 227,510
 2005: 228,926
 2004: 229,172
 2003: 236,570
 2002: 230,987
 2001: 223,819
 1994: 176,251
 1993: 153,146

Per federal state 
In year 2019

Cities 
In year 2019

Among the German cities Stuttgart and Pforzheim had the highest share of Croats in 2011 according to German Census data.

Notable Croatians and people of Croatian descent in Germany

 Fredi Bobic, former footballer
 Stipe Erceg, actor
 Werner Herzog, film director
 Milko Kelemen, professor at the Stuttgarter Musikakademie Stuttgart
 Ivan Klasnić, footballer
 Niko Kovač, football coach and former player
 Robert Kovač, football coach and former player
 Vanessa Mai, singer
 Sandra Nasić, singer for the rock band, Guano Apes
 Ivo Robić, musician
 Zvonimir Serdarušić, handball coach
 Edin Terzić, football coach and former player
 Jeremy Toljan, football player
 Jasmin Wagner, singer
 Nikki Adler, boxer

See also 
 Croatia–Germany relations
 Croats
 List of Croats

References

External links 
Croatian Academic Union Germany Hrvatski akademski savez: Network of students and academics in Germany who are Croatians or of Croatian descent
Kroatische Zeitung News about business, education, society, tourism and sports

Germany
 
Ethnic groups in Germany